Ashwin Mushran is an Indian actor and voice over artist. He has appeared in numerous movies and plays. He is also featured in the movie Quick Gun Murugan, as Dr. Django. He also lent his voice into dubbing several foreign media.

Education
Ashwin Mushran was born in Mumbai, Maharashtra, India to a Kashmiri Pandit father and a White British mother of English and German descent. Mushran's paternal family were displaced from Kashmir during the Exodus of Kashmiri Hindus in the 1990s due to the Islamic militancy which quickly turned Anti-Hindu. Ashwin studied at The Doon School in Dehradun, Uttarakhand and then graduated with a Bachelor of Arts (Honours) degree in English Literature from Hindu College, University of Delhi in New Delhi. He then moved to England from India to study acting at the Drama Studio London in Ealing, West London.

Career
Ashwin started out with TV commercials which led to him becoming a cast member of the cult Indian TV show, The Great Indian Comedy Show. From there he moved on to acting in feature films and has acted in many critically acclaimed films such as Lage Raho Munna Bhai, Life in a Metro and Fashion. Ashwin is heavily involved with theatre and is a voice over artiste as well.

Dubbing career
He has dubbed for more than 1000 TV commercials and a number of movies in Africa English, and Chinese (both Mandarin and Cantonese); however, he said that he had no desire to dub for the leading amen of Bollywood.

Personal life
Mushran is married, and has a daughter

Filmography

Films

Television

Web series

Dubbing roles

Live action films

Animated films

Live action television series

References

External links

 
 

1972 births
Living people
Kashmiri people
Indian Hindus
Kashmiri Hindus
Kashmiri Pandits
Kashmiri Brahmins
Indian people of Kashmiri descent
Indian people of British descent
Indian people of English descent
Indian people of German descent
The Doon School alumni
Hindu College, Delhi alumni
Delhi University alumni
Alumni of the Drama Studio London
Indian male film actors
Indian male voice actors
Male actors in Hindi cinema
People from Mumbai
Male actors from Mumbai